Bustleholme Football Club is a football club based in West Bromwich, West Midlands, England.

History
The club was established as a youth team in 1975 by parents of the players. In 1996 they joined Division One South of the West Midlands (Regional) League. After finishing as runners-up in their 1996–97, the club were promoted to the Premier Division. Despite finishing bottom of the Premier Division in 2007–08, the club were not relegated. This was repeated the following season.

In 2009–10 Bustleholme won the league's Premier Division Cup, beating AFC Wulfrunians 1–0 in the final. They avoided relegation again after finishing bottom of the Premier Division in 2012–13, but a second-from-bottom finish the following season saw the club relegated to Division One.

Ground
The club groundshared at Queen Street in Bilston until 2007. They later moved to Tipton Town's Tipton Sports Academy Ground, before relocating to York Road (formerly the home ground of Oldbury United) in Rowley Regis in 2018.

Honours
West Midlands (Regional) League
Premier League Cup winners 2009–10

Records
Best FA Cup performance: Extra-preliminary round, 2011–12
Best FA Vase performance: Third round, 2010–11

References

External links
Official website

Football clubs in England
Football clubs in the West Midlands (county)
Association football clubs established in 1975
1975 establishments in England
Sport in Sandwell
West Bromwich
West Midlands (Regional) League